may refer to:

Places
Chūō-ku (disambiguation), city wards named Chūō
Chūō, Tokyo, a special ward in Tokyo
Chūō, Yamanashi, a city in Yamanashi Prefecture
Chūō, Kumamoto, a former town in Kumamoto Prefecture
Chūō, Okayama, a former town in Okayama Prefecture

Transport
Chūō Line (disambiguation), railway lines connecting Tokyo to Nagoya 
Chūō Shinkansen, a maglev line under construction between Tokyo and Osaka
Chūō Expressway, a toll road connecting Tokyo and Nagoya

Other
Chuo University, Tokyo
CHUO-FM, a Canadian community-based campus radio station
 (Korean: 중앙 (Hanja: 中央))
Zhongyang (disambiguation)